Ewan Rosser (born 16 December 2000) is a Welsh rugby union player for Dragons in the United Rugby Championship. Rosser's primary position is wing.

Rugby Union career

Professional career

Rosser was named in the Dragons academy squad for the 2021–22 season. He is yet to debut for the Dragons, but has represented Wales Sevens at one tournament. In 2022, He competed for Wales at the Rugby World Cup Sevens in Cape Town.

References

2000 births
Living people
Dragons RFC players
Rugby union wings
Welsh rugby union players
Rugby sevens players at the 2022 Commonwealth Games